Floriade is the name of several flower events:

Floriade (Canberra), a flower festival held annually in Canberra, Australia.
Floriade (Netherlands), a large flower and gardening exhibition held every 10 years in the Netherlands.